The 2002 Spanish Formula Three Championship was the second Spanish Formula Three season. It began on 7 April at Albacete and ended on 10 November at Circuit de Catalunya in Montmeló after thirteen races. Marcel Costa was crowned series champion.

Teams and drivers
 All teams were Spanish-registered. All cars were powered by Toyota engines, Dallara F300 chassis and Dunlop tyres.

Calendar

Standings

Drivers' standings
Points were awarded as follows:

Teams' standings 
Points were awarded as follows:

References

External links
 Official Site

Formula Three season
Euroformula Open Championship seasons
Spanish
Spanish Formula 3